Asbach is a Verbandsgemeinde ("collective municipality") in the district of Neuwied, in Rhineland-Palatinate, Germany. The seat of the Verbandsgemeinde is in Asbach.

The Verbandsgemeinde Asbach consists of the following Ortsgemeinden ("local municipalities"):

 Asbach
 Buchholz 
 Neustadt (Wied) 
 Windhagen

Verbandsgemeinde in Rhineland-Palatinate